Tufo is a town and comune in the province of Avellino, Campania, southern Italy. As of 2009 its population was of 938.

History
The name of the town derives from the tuff, the volcanic rock that is widely present in the subsoil of the whole area of the country.

Geography
Tufo is bordered by the municipalities Altavilla Irpina, Petruro Irpino, Prata di Principato Ultra, Santa Paolina and Torrioni. The Sabato river flows south of the town.

Gastronomy
The town has given its name to the popular white wine known as "Greco di Tufo" (Greek of Tufo).

Personalities
Xavier J. Barile (1891 – 1981), painter
Dante Troisi (1920 – 1989), writer

See also
1980 Irpinia earthquake

References

External links
 Official website of Tufo

Cities and towns in Campania